Qiaotouhe Town is an urban town in Lianyuan, Hunan Province, People's Republic of China.

Administrative division
The town is divided into 83 villages and 4 communities, the following areas: 

   Qiaonan Community
   Qiaomei Community
   Guanlan Community
   Hongqiao Community
   Huazhi Village
   Qiaotouhe Village
   Qiaotoushan Village
   Shuiyuan Village
   Lumao Village
   Xingguang Village
   Longwan Village
   Shanmu Village
   Zhuxi Village
   Nidong Village
   Taiping Village
   Dafan Village
   Shiping Village
   Ganchong Village
   Qingtang Village
   Duzi Village
   Cuoshu Village
   Shiqiao Village
   Qingcao Village
   Fenghua Village
   Zicha Village
   Datang Village
   Shanchun Village
   Zhangtan Village
   Longjian  Village
   Bailiu Village
   Mujia Village
   Qunjian Village
   Banv Village
   Xinguang Village
   Fengshu Village
   Shiyaotang Village
   Qunfeng Village
   Wujin Village
   Sanlongchong Village
   Fengyu Village
   Qinglong Village
   Tanshantang Village
   Shezhong Village
   Jingtang Village
   Yanzi Village
   Yuzhong Village
   Shidong Village
   Shigou Village
   Dashui Village
   Shuitong Village
   Yanxi Village
   Yeyatang Village
   Yangjia Village
   Wentang Village
   Xiashanwan Village
   Sanhe Village
   Xinhua Village
   Zhumu Village
   Hexing Village
   Gonghe Village
   Jietou Village
   Hejia Village
   Huamei Village
   Xinchang Village
   Huangzhu Village
   Tianxinwan Village
   Baihu Village
   Duanjiang Village
   Chetian Village
   Xinpei Village
   Wuxing Village
   Minzhu Village
   Zhongshan Village
   Jingkeng Village
   Guihua Village
   Shouhua Village
   Youcao Village
   Baiju Village
   Zhuhuang Village
   Houwan Village
   Motang Village
   Dongchong Village
   Dongshi Village
   Dawu Village
   Zhuze Village
   Daxin Village

External links

Divisions of Lianyuan